Mark William James O'Toole (born 6 January 1964) is an English musician. He is the former bassist and founding member of 1980s pop band, Frankie Goes to Hollywood. His elder brother, Gerard, was also a member of FGTH, but soon left the band.

A musician from an early age, O'Toole co-wrote all of Frankie Goes To Hollywood's hits such as "Relax", "Two Tribes" and "The Power of Love". Frankie Goes to Hollywood primarily enjoyed success in 1984, at one time occupying the top two places in the UK Singles Chart. The band split in 1987.

References

External links 
 

1964 births
Living people
English rock bass guitarists
Male bass guitarists
English new wave musicians
Frankie Goes to Hollywood members
British expatriates in the United States
Musicians from Liverpool